Poimandres (also known as Poemandres, Poemander or Pimander) is the first tractate in the Corpus Hermeticum.

Etymology
Originally written in Greek, the title was formerly understood to mean "Man-Shepherd" from the words ποιμήν and ἀνήρ, but recent studies on its etymology allege that it is actually derived from the Egyptian phrase Peime-nte-rê meaning "Knowledge of Re" or "Understanding of Re".

Description
The character Poimandres can be considered to be a sort of deity, or attribute of God as nous or "mind" as expressed in the following translations.

John Everard translation:
Then said I, "Who art Thou?"
"I am," quoth he, "Poemander, the mind of the Great Lord, the most Mighty and absolute Emperor: I know what thou wouldest have, and I am always present with thee."

G. R. S. Mead translation:
And I do say: Who art thou?
He saith: I am Man-Shepherd [Ποιμάνδρης], Mind of all-masterhood; I know what thou desirest and I'm with thee everywhere.

Brian P. Copenhaver translation:
"Who are you?" I asked.
"I am Poimandres," he said, "mind of sovereignty; I know what you want, and I am with you everywhere."

Salaman, Van Oyen and Wharton translation:
"Who are you?" said I.
He said, "I am Poimandres the Nous of the Supreme. I know what you wish and I am with you everywhere."

See also
Hermes TrismegistusHermetica, writings attributed to Hermes Trismegistus
Hermeticism, philosophical systems based on the writings attributed to Hermes Trismegistus

References

External links
Pœmandres, the Shepherd of Men – Translation by G.R.S. Mead, 1906.
Poemander – Translation by John Everard, 1650.
Pimander – Latin translation by Marsilio Ficino, Milano: Damianus de Mediolano 1493.
The Theological and Philosophical Works of Hermes Trismegistus – translation by John David Chambers, 1882.
 The Corpus Hermeticum from Thrice Great Hermes: Studies in Hellenistic Theosophy and Gnosis, Volume II at The Internet Sacred Text Archive
 Ἑρμου του Τρισμεγιστου ΠΟΙΜΑΝΔΡΗΣ – Greek text of the 'Poimandres'
 Hermetis Trismegisti Poemander – Complete Greek text of Poemander and Latin translation, G. Parthey (ed.), 1854.
 Corpus Hermeticum'' – Critical edition and French translation; 4 vols.; eds. A.D. Nock & A.-J. Festugière. Paris: Belles Lettres, 1946–1954.

Creation myths
Hermetica